Palagyi or Palágyi is a Hungarian surname. Notable people with the surname include:

Gergely Palágyi (born 1979), Hungarian hurdler 
Lajos Palágyi (1866–1933), Hungarian poet
Menyhért Palágyi (1859–1924), Hungarian philosopher, mathematician, and physicist
Mike Palagyi (1917–2013), American Major League Baseball pitcher

Hungarian-language surnames